The Pauline epistles, also known as Epistles of Paul or Letters of Paul, are the thirteen books of the New Testament attributed to Paul the Apostle, although the authorship of some is in dispute. Among these epistles are some of the earliest extant Christian documents. They provide an insight into the beliefs and controversies of early Christianity. As part of the canon of the New Testament, they are foundational texts for both Christian theology and ethics.

Most scholars believe that Paul actually wrote seven of the Pauline epistles (Galatians, Romans, 1 Corinthians, 2 Corinthians, Philemon, Philippians, 1 Thessalonians), while three of the epistles in Paul's name are widely seen as pseudepigraphic (First Timothy, Second Timothy, and Titus). Whether Paul wrote the three other epistles in his name (2 Thessalonians, Ephesians and Colossians) is widely debated. According to some scholars, Paul wrote the questionable letters with the help of a secretary, or amanuensis, who would have influenced their style, if not their theological content. The Epistle to the Hebrews, although it does not bear his name, was traditionally considered Pauline (although Origen, Tertullian and Hippolytus amongst others, questioned its authorship), but from the 16th century onwards opinion steadily moved against Pauline authorship and few scholars now ascribe it to Paul, mostly because it does not read like any of his other epistles in style and content and because the epistle does not indicate that Paul is the author, unlike the others.

The Pauline epistles are usually placed between the Acts of the Apostles and the catholic epistles in modern editions. Most Greek manuscripts place the general epistles first, and a few minuscules (175, 325, 336, and 1424) place the Pauline epistles at the end of the New Testament.

Authenticity 

In all of these epistles, except the Epistle to the Hebrews, the author and writer does claim to be Paul. The contested letters may have been written using Paul's name, as it was common to attribute at that point in history.

Seven letters (with consensus dates) considered genuine by most scholars:
 Galatians (c. 48 AD)
 First Thessalonians (c. 49–51)
 First Corinthians (c. 53–54)
 Second Corinthians (c. 55–56)
 Romans (c. 55–57)
 Philippians (c. 57–59 or c. 62)
 Philemon (c. 57–59 or c. 62)

The three letters on which scholars are about evenly divided: If these letters are inauthentic, then the consensus dates are probably incorrect.
 Second Thessalonians (c. 51–52)
 Colossians (c. 57–59 or c. 62)
 Ephesians (c. 62)

The letters thought to be pseudepigraphic by many scholars (traditional dating given): The content of these letters strongly suggest they were written a decade or more later than the traditional dates.
 First Timothy (c. 62–64)
 Second Timothy (c. 62–65)
 Titus (c. 66–67)

Finally, Epistle to the Hebrews, although anonymous and not really in the form of a letter, has long been included among Paul's collected letters. Although some churches ascribe Hebrews to Paul, neither most of Christianity nor modern scholarship does so.

Order 
In the order they appear in the New Testament, the Pauline epistles are:

This ordering is remarkably consistent in the manuscript tradition, with very few deviations. The evident principle of organization is descending length of the Greek text, but keeping the four pastoral epistles addressed to individuals in a separate final section. The only anomaly is that Galatians precedes the slightly longer Ephesians.

In modern editions, the formally anonymous Epistle to the Hebrews is placed at the end of Paul's letters and before the general epistles. This practice was popularized through the 4th century Vulgate by Jerome, who was aware of ancient doubts about its authorship, and is also followed in most medieval Byzantine manuscripts with hardly any exceptions.

The placement of Hebrews among the Pauline epistles is less consistent in the manuscripts:
 between Romans and 1 Corinthians (i.e., in order by length without splitting the Epistles to the Corinthians): Papyrus 46 and minuscules 103, 455, 1961, 1964, 1977, 1994.
 between 2 Corinthians and Galatians: minuscules 1930, 1978, and 2248
 between Galatians and Ephesians: implied by the numbering in B. In B, Galatians ends and Ephesians begins on the same side of the same folio (page 1493); similarly 2 Thessalonians ends and Hebrews begins on the same side of the same folio (page 1512).
 between 2 Thessalonians and 1 Timothy (i.e., before the Pastorals): א, A, B, C, H, I, P, 0150, 0151, and about 60 minuscules (e.g. 218, 632)
 after Philemon: D, 048, E, K, L and the majority of minuscules.
 omitted: F and G

Lost Pauline epistles
Paul's own writings are sometimes thought to indicate several of his letters that have not been preserved:
 A first, or "zeroth", epistle to Corinth, possibly referenced at 1 Corinthians 5:9.
 A third epistle to Corinth, written in between 1 and 2 Corinthians, also called the Severe Letter, referenced at 2 Corinthians 2:4 and 2 Corinthians 7:8-9
 An earlier epistle to the Ephesians referenced at Ephesians 3:3-4
 A possible Pauline Epistle to the Laodiceans, referenced at Colossians 4:16

Pseudepigraphic epistles 

Several other epistles were attributed to Paul during the course of history but are now considered pseudepigraphic:
 Third Epistle to the Corinthians, a correspondence of two letters allegedly sent by the Corinthians to Paul, and then a reply letter allegedly sent by Paul to the Church of Corinth.  It was considered genuine for some time by the Syriac Orthodox Church and the Armenian Apostolic Church, but is now widely dated in the second half of the 2nd century CE.
Epistle to the Alexandrians, an alleged epistle written by Paul to the Church of Alexandria. It is mentioned in the Muratorian fragment (2nd century CE), which denounces it as a spurious work forged by Marcion of Sinope. Its text has been lost and nothing is known about its content.
 Non-Pauline Epistle to the Laodiceans versions:
 The Marcionite Epistle to the Laodiceans.  The Muratorian fragment (2nd century CE) denounces a claimed Epistle to the Laodiceans as a spurious work forged by Marcion of Sinope. Its text has been lost and nothing is known about its content.
 The Latin Epistle to the Laodiceans.  It is found in some old Latin Bible manuscripts, but is widely considered a forgery, and is largely a copy of verses from the Epistle to the Philippians.  Theories vary, but it was possibly made as a counterforgery to offset the popularity of the Marcionite epistle.
 Correspondence of Paul and Seneca, a collection of correspondence claiming to be between Paul and Seneca the Younger. They are universally considered a forgery from the 4th century CE.

Collected epistles
David Trobisch finds it likely that Paul first collected his letters for publication himself. It was normal practice in Paul's time for letter writers to keep one copy for themselves and send a second copy to the recipient(s); surviving collections of ancient letters sometimes originated from the senders' copies, at other times from the recipients' copies. A collection of Paul's letters circulated separately from other early Christian writings and later became part of the New Testament. When the canon was established, the gospels and Paul's letters were the core of what would become the New Testament.

See also 

 Biblical apocrypha
 New Testament athletic metaphors
 New Testament military metaphors

References

Bibliographic resources
 Aland Kurt. "The Problem of Anonymity and Pseudonymity in Christian Literature of the First Two Centuries." Journal of Theological Studies 12 (1961): 39–49.
 Bahr, Gordon J. "Paul and Letter Writing in the First Century." Catholic Biblical Quarterly 28 (1966): 465–77. idem, "The Subscriptions in the Pauline Letters." Journal of Biblical Literature 2 (1968): 27–41.
 Bauckham, Richard J. "Pseudo-Apostolic Letters." Journal of Biblical Literature 107 (1988): 469–94.
 Carson, D.A. "Pseudonymity and Pseudepigraphy." Dictionary of New Testament Background. Eds. Craig A. Evans and Stanley E. Porter. Downers Grove: InterVarsity, 2000. 857–64.
 Cousar, Charles B. The Letters of Paul. Interpreting Biblical Texts. Nashville: Abingdon, 1996.
 Deissmann, G. Adolf. Bible Studies. Trans. Alexander Grieve. 1901. Peabody: Hendrickson, 1988.
 Doty, William G. Letters in Primitive Christianity. Guides to Biblical Scholarship. New Testament. Ed. Dan O. Via, Jr. Philadelphia: Fortress, 1988.
 Gamble, Harry Y. "Amanuensis." Anchor Bible Dictionary. Vol. 1. Ed. David Noel Freedman. New York: Doubleday, 1992.
 Haines-Eitzen, Kim. "‘Girls Trained in Beautiful Writing’: Female Scribes in Roman Antiquity and Early Christianity." Journal of Early Christian Studies 6.4 (1998): 629–46.
 Hart, David Bentley. "The New Testament." New Haven and London: Yale University Press: 2017. 570–74.
 Kim, Yung Suk. A Theological Introduction to Paul's Letters. Eugene, Oregon: Cascade Books, 2011.
 Longenecker, Richard N. "Ancient Amanuenses and the Pauline Epistles." New Dimensions in New Testament Study. Eds. Richard N. Longenecker and Merrill C. Tenney. Grand Rapids: Zondervan, 1974. 281–97. idem, "On the Form, Function, and Authority of the New Testament Letters." Scripture and Truth. Eds. D.A. Carson and John D. Woodbridge. Grand Rapids: Zondervan, 1983. 101–14.
 Murphy-O’Connor, Jerome. Paul the Letter-Writer: His World, His Options, His Skills. Collegeville, MN: Liturgical, 1995.
 Richards, E. Randolph. The Secretary in the Letters of Paul. Tübingen: Mohr, 1991. idem, "The Codex and the Early Collection of Paul’s Letters." Bulletin for Bulletin Research 8 (1998): 151–66. idem, Paul and First-Century Letter Writing: Secretaries, Composition, and Collection. Downers Grove: InterVarsity, 2004.
 Robson, E. Iliff. "Composition and Dictation in New Testament Books." Journal of Theological Studies 18 (1917): 288–301.
Slaten, Arthur Wakefield (1918) "Qualitative nouns in the Pauline epistles and their translation in the revised version". Chicago, Illonis: The University of Chicago Press. OCLC: 1051723498
 Stowers, Stanley K. Letter Writing in Greco-Roman Antiquity. Library of Early Christianity. Vol. 8. Ed. Wayne A. Meeks. Philadelphia: Westminster, 1989.
 Wall, Robert W. "Introduction to Epistolary Literature." New Interpreter’s Bible. Vol. 10. Ed. Leander E. Keck. Nashville: Abingdon, 2002. 369–91.

External links 
 The Marcionite Prologues to the Pauline Epistles
 Chronological Order of Paul's Letters
 Chronology of Paul's Letters 
 MS 484/13 Epistolae cum glossis at OPenn

 
Canonical epistles
Christian terminology
Collections of letters